Interleukin 11 receptor, alpha subunit is a subunit of the interleukin 11 receptor. IL11RA is its human gene.

Interleukin 11 is a stromal cell-derived cytokine that belongs to a family of pleiotropic and redundant cytokines that use the gp130 transducing subunit in their high affinity receptors. This gene encodes the IL-11 receptor, which is a member of the hematopoietic cytokine receptor family. This particular receptor is very similar to ciliary neurotrophic factor, since both contain an extracellular region with a 2-domain structure composed of an immunoglobulin-like domain and a cytokine receptor-like domain. Alternative splicing has been observed at this locus and two variants, each encoding a distinct isoform, have been identified.

References

Further reading